Padraig O'Malley (born 1942 in Dublin, Ireland) is an Irish international peacemaker, author, and professor. O'Malley specializes in the problems of divided societies, such as South Africa and Northern Ireland. He has written extensively on these subjects and has been actively involved in promoting dialogue among representatives of differing factions. He's currently the John Joseph Moakley Distinguished Professor of Peace and Reconciliation at the University of Massachusetts Boston.

Early life and education
O'Malley was born in Dublin.  He was educated at University College, Dublin, and at Yale, Tufts and Harvard universities in the United States.

Peace activism

Northern Ireland 

O'Malley spent 20 years involved with the conflict in Northern Ireland. Working with all the political parties to the conflict, he convened the Amherst Conference on Northern Ireland (Massachusetts, 1975), the Airlie House Conference (Virginia, 1985), and co–convened the Arniston Conference with the government of South Africa (Western Cape, 1997).

In 1992, he participated in bringing some of the South African figures to Boston, Massachusetts for a meeting with representatives of the factions in Northern Ireland. In 1996, he helped arrange a second such meeting, in Belfast, attended by South Africans Cyril Ramaphosa of the African National Congress and Roelf Meyer of the white National Party.

In 1997, the Arniston Conference (also known as The Great Indaba) convened all the key parties of The Northern Irish peace process in South Africa to meet with Nelson Mandela.  Included in the meeting from Northern Ireland were Martin McGuinness, David Trimble and Peter Robinson.

"The outcome of the Indaba (the Zulu word for "gathering of the minds") was a series of historic events. Seven weeks after the conference, Sinn Féin declared a cease fire that paved the way for negotiations and ultimately the fragile Good Friday Agreement to share power, still in place today. A year later, Trimble and John Hume, leader of the Social Democratic and Labour Party, were awarded the Nobel prize for peace. And most recently, in fall 2001, the IRA mustered the courage to destroy its weapons to further the cause of peace. That stunning announcement came two weeks after Gerry Adams of Sinn Féin once again visited former president Mandela in South Africa."

O'Malley was also a member of the Opshal Commission, which authored the report "Northern Ireland: A Citizens' Inquiry" (Belfast, 1993)

South Africa 

Between 1989-1999, O'Malley conducted 2,000 hours of interviews tracking South Africa's transition to democracy.  His work is archived in written transcription and on audio tape at the Robben Island Museum/Mayibuye Archives [University of the Western Cape]. His assiduous work of recording the different perspectives and developing attitudes within South Africa during the ten-year period had earned Nelson Mandela's highest regard. What particularly impressed Mr. Mandela was O'Malley's determination to face the greatest challenge posed once upon a time by W.B. Yeats, namely 'to hold in a single thought reality and justice'.

Iraq 

In 2007, based on his philosophy that cultures in conflict are in the best position to help other cultures in conflict, O'Malley became involved in working toward reconciliation within Iraq.  He helped arrange a conference at a resort in Finland, where 16 Iraqis met senior negotiators from South Africa (SA), including Cyril Ramaphosa, chief negotiator for the African National Congress (ANC) under the leadership of Nelson Mandela; Roelf Meyer, chief negotiator for South Africa's last whites- only government and Mac Maharaj, who was co. secretary of the South African negotiating process.  Senior negotiators from Northern Ireland (NI), including Martin McGuinness from Sinn Féin, currently Deputy First Minister of NI, Jeffrey Donaldson from the Democratic Unionist Party (DUP).

O'Malley's role included recruiting the Iraqi participants, then roaming around Baghdad with $40,000 in cash and covertly procuring their airline tickets.  The Iraqis concluded the meeting by agreeing among themselves on a statement based partly on the Mitchell Principles developed during the Northern Ireland peace process.  The Boston Globe reported:

There would be two meetings, Helsinki I and Helsinki II. "The participants in what O'Malley calls "Helsinki II" are an even more senior influential group than those who drafted the Helsinki principles. They include senior members of parliament and prominent tribal leaders. Among them is the head of the Iraqi Constitutional Review Committee, Sheik Humam Hamoudi, whose participation was endorsed by the speaker of the Iraqi parliament. The ethnic representation of the 36 at the meeting roughly reflects that of the Iraqi population, with 25 percent Sunni, 25 percent Kurdish, and 50 percent Shi'ite participation."

Additional professional life 
Padraig has owned the Plough and Stars pub in Cambridge, Massachusetts since the early 1970s. His brother Peter O'Malley, with DeWitt Henry, started the renowned literary magazine Ploughshares, publishing it at first, out of the back of the bar.

O'Malley has monitored elections in South Africa, Mozambique, and the Philippines on behalf of the National Democratic Institute for International Affairs. He is also a frequent contributor to The Boston Globe.

At the University of Massachusetts Boston, he is the John Joseph Moakley Professor of International Peace and Reconciliation at the John W. McCormack Graduate School of Policy Studies; a Senior Fellow in the Center for Development and Democracy; and the founder and editor of the New England Journal of Public Policy, a semiannual publication of the McCormack Graduate School.  He is also a Visiting Professor of Political Studies at the University of the Western Cape in South Africa.  O'Malley was honored with the Peace Abbey Foundation Courage of Conscience Award at the Community Church of Boston in 2018 for playing a major role in breaking the gridlock and promoting peace in South Africa, Northern Ireland, and the Middle East.

Bibliography

Books authored

 Irish Industry: Structure and Performance (as Patrick O'Malley) (1971  and 
 The Uncivil Wars: Ireland Today (1983, 1990, 1997)  and  - won the Christopher Ewart-Biggs Memorial Prize
 Biting at the Grave: The Irish Hunger Strikes and the Politics of Despair (1990) ; paperback 1991 
 Northern Ireland: Questions of Nuance (1990) 
 The Point of No Return: The Politics of South Africa on Election Day April 1994 (published by the National Democratic Institute for International Affairs)
 Religion and Conflict: The Case of Northern Ireland (1995)
 Shades of Difference: Mac Maharaj and the Struggle for South Africa (2007) (foreword by Nelson Mandela) 
 The Two-State Delusion: Israel and Palestine - A Tale of Two Narratives (2015)

Books edited

 The AIDS Epidemic: Private Rights and the Public Interest (1989) 
 Homelessness: New England and Beyond (1992) 
 Uneven Paths: Advancing Democracy in Southern Africa (1994)
 Sticks & Stones: Living With Uncertain Wars (2006) (co-edited with Paul L. Atwood and Patricia Peterson)

References

External links
 Padraig O'Malley papers, 1980-2006, University Archives and Special Collections, Joseph P. Healey Library, University of Massachusetts Boston
 "The Heart of Hope", O'Malley's website
 New England Journal of Public Policy website
 "A Pre-Negotiation Guide to the Conflict in Northern Ireland", an O'Malley briefing paper for the National Democratic Institute for International Affairs (September 1994) with a Postscript (March 1995)
 The Eire Society of Boston, Honors Padraig O'Malley as a 2008 Gold Medal Recipient
 "Speaks at The American Ireland Fund Nantucket Celebration 2008"
 "The peacemaker: Padraig O’Malley brings warring factions to the table", John Stanton, Contributing Writer, The Inquirer & Mirror
 "Iraq: Unjust War, Impossible Reconciliation?" Video of talk given at Boston University's Institute for Philosophy and Religion, 21 March 2009

Living people
1942 births
Irish emigrants to the United States
Writers from Dublin (city)
University of Massachusetts Boston faculty
Alumni of University College Dublin
Yale University alumni
Tufts University alumni
Harvard University alumni
Academic staff of the University of the Western Cape
Christopher Ewart-Biggs Memorial Prize recipients